Theodore Joseph Rivlin (11 September 1926, Brooklyn – 22 July 2006, Croton-on-Hudson) was an American mathematician, specializing in approximation theory. He is known for his 1969 book An Introduction to the Approximation of Functions (Dover reprint, 1981), which became a standard text.

Education and career
Rivlin received in 1948 his bachelor's degree from Brooklyn College. After serving in the United States Army Air Force for eighteen months, he became a graduate student in mathematics at Harvard University, where he received in 1953 his Ph.D. with thesis advisor Joseph L. Walsh and thesis Overconvergent Taylor series and the zeroes of related polynomials. Rivlin from 1952 to 1955 taught mathematics at Johns Hopkins University and from 1955 to 1956 was a research associate at the Institute for Mathematics Sciences at New York University (later renamed the Courant Institute of Mathematical Sciences). He was from 1956 to 1959 a senior mathematical analyst at the Fairchild Engine and Airplane Corporation in Deer Park on Long Island; there he began intensive study of approximation theory and Chebyshev polynomials in connection with his work on developing thermodynamic tables. From 1959 until his retirement nearly 35 years later, Rivlin was a research staff member at IBM's Thomas J. Watson Research Center in Yorktown Heights, New York. He was on sabbatical from 1969 to 1970 at Stanford University's Computer Science Department and from 1976 to 1977 at Imperial College London's Mathematics Department.

From 1966 to 1976 Rivlin was an adjunct professor of mathematics at the Graduate Center of the City University of New York, where he lectured on approximation theory. For many years he was an associate editor for the Journal of Approximation Theory and wrote over 80 research articles on approximation theory and computational mathematics. The Annals of Numerical Analysis published in 1997 a special issue entitled The Heritage of P.L. Chebyshev: A Festschrift in honor of the 70th birthday of T.J. Rivlin.

Selected publications

Articles
 with Nesmith C. Ankeny:  
 with Harold S. Shapiro: 
 with Richard Kelisky: 
 with Charles A. Micchelli and Shmuel Winograd: 
 with C. A. Micchelli: 
 with C. A. Micchelli:

Books
;

References

1926 births
2006 deaths
20th-century American mathematicians
Approximation theorists
Mathematical analysts
Brooklyn College alumni
Harvard University alumni
IBM employees